San Miguel el Alto is a town and municipality, in Jalisco in central-western Mexico. The municipality covers an area of 580 km².

As of 2005, the municipality had a total population of 40,000.

The municipality includes the town of San José de los Reynoso.

It was the setting and filming location for the 1957 film, Los chiflados del rock and roll, starring Luis Aguilar.

Fiestas
San Miguel is known for its beautiful patronal festival that lasts from 19 September to 29 September. The celebration is in honor of Saint Michael the Arch Angel. Many events like horse races, artist performance, fireworks, and the coronation of the fiesta queen take place.

Sister cities
Jalostotitlan, Jalisco

References

External links

Municipalities of Jalisco